Object Lisp was a computer programming language, a dialect of the Lisp language. It was an object-oriented extension for the Lisp dialect Lisp Machine Lisp, designed by Lisp Machines, Inc. Object Lisp was also an early example of prototype-based programming.

It was seen as a competitor to other object-oriented extensions to Lisp at around the same time such as Flavors, in use by Symbolics, Common Objects developed by Hewlett-Packard, and CommonLoops, in use by Xerox.

Object Lisp was also used in early versions of Macintosh Common Lisp. There, the user interface toolkit was written using Object Lisp.

References

14 December 1985 net.lang.lisp USENET post about the Common Lisp meeting in Boston, 9-11 December 1985, which discusses Object Lisp
"ObjectLISP User Manual", G. Drescher, LMI 1985

Object-oriented programming languages
Lisp programming language family